San Andrés de los Tacones Reservoir  is a reservoir in Asturias, Spain across the Aboño River. It is located between the parishes of San Andrés de los Tacones and Serín, in the municipality of Gijón.

The reservoir, next to the Autovía A-66, is property of Arcelor and its construction was finished in 1964 with the aim of supply water to the steel plant located in Gijón.

In 2002, the City Hall of the municipality decided to open in the reservoir the first bird observatory of the city.

The reservoir is supplied by river Aboño.

References

External links
Profile at SEPREM

Dams completed in 1964
Reservoirs in Asturias
Dams in Spain